Pierre-Étienne Piestre, known as Eugène Cormon (5 May 1810 – March 1903), was a French dramatist and librettist. He used his mother's name, Cormon, during his career.

Cormon wrote dramas, comedies and, from the 1840s, libretti; around 150 of his works were published. He was stage manager at the Paris Opéra from 1859 to 1870, and administrator of the Théâtre du Vaudeville from 1874.

His libretti include Les dragons de Villars (with Lockroy), Gastibelza (with d'Ennery) and Les pêcheurs de Catane (with Carré) for Maillart, Les pêcheurs de perles (with Carré) for Bizet, Robinson Crusoé (with Crémieux) for Offenbach, and Les Bleuets (with Trianon) for Cohen.

The Fontainebleau act as well as the auto-da-fé scene of Verdi's opera Don Carlos is based in part on Cormon's 1846 play Philippe II, Roi d'Espagne ("Philip II, King of Spain").

At the Moscow Art Theatre in 1927 the seminal Russian theatre practitioner Constantin Stanislavski staged Cormon's melodrama The Gérard Sisters  (The Two Orphans), which he co-wrote with Adolphe d'Ennery.

Plays 
Les Crochets du père Martin. Drama in three acts (with Eugène Grangé, 1858)
Le Château Trompette. Opera by François-Auguste Gevaert (with Michel Carré, 1860)
The Two Orphans. Drama in five acts (with Adolphe d'Ennery, 20 January 1874)
Une Cause célèbre. Drama in six acts (with Adolphe d'Ennery, 1877)
Eine Nacht in Venedig. Operetta by Johann Strauss II (F. Zell and Richard Genée, 1883, based on Le Château Trompette)

Filmography
A Celebrated Case, directed by George Melford (1914, based on the play Une Cause célèbre)
The Two Orphans, directed by Herbert Brenon (1915, based on the play The Two Orphans)
Orphans of the Storm, directed by D. W. Griffith (1921, based on the play The Two Orphans)
The Two Orphans, directed by Maurice Tourneur (France, 1933, based on the play The Two Orphans)
, directed by Mario Bonnard (Italy, 1940, based on the play Les Crochets du père Martin)
The Two Orphans, directed by Carmine Gallone (Italy, 1942, based on the play The Two Orphans)
The Two Orphans, directed by José Benavides (Mexico, 1944, based on the play The Two Orphans)
The Two Orphans, directed by Hassan al-Imam (Egypt, 1949, based on the play The Two Orphans)
The Two Orphans, directed by Roberto Rodríguez (Mexico, 1950, based on the play The Two Orphans)
A Night in Venice, directed by Georg Wildhagen (Austria, 1953, based on the operetta Eine Nacht in Venedig)
The Two Orphans, directed by Giacomo Gentilomo (Italy, 1954, based on the play The Two Orphans)
The Two Orphans, directed by Riccardo Freda (France/Italy, 1965, based on the play The Two Orphans)
The Two Orphans, directed by Leopoldo Savona (Spain, 1976, based on the play The Two Orphans)

References

Sources
Benedetti, Jean (1999), Stanislavski: His Life and Art. Revised edition. Original edition published in 1988. London: Methuen. .
Budden, Julian (1984),  The Operas of Verdi, Volume 3:  From  Don Carlos to Falstaff.  London: Cassell. 
Kimball, David (2001), in Holden, Amanda (Ed.), The New Penguin Opera Guide, New York: Penguin Putnam, 2001. 
Walsh, T. J. (1981), Second Empire Opera: The Théâtre Lyrique Paris 1851–1870. London: John Calder.
Wright, Lesley (1998),  "Eugene Cormon" in Stanley Sadie, (Ed.),  The New Grove Dictionary of Opera, Vol. One. London: Macmillan Publishers, Inc. 1998  ISzrgbb BN 0-333-73432-7

External links
 

1810 births
1903 deaths
French opera librettists
Writers from Lyon
19th-century French dramatists and playwrights
Chevaliers of the Légion d'honneur